Dorothy Mary Venning (15 January 1885–1942) was a British artist and sculptor.

Biography
Venning was born at Camberwell in London where her father was a school master. She was educated at the Mary Datchelor School on Camberwell Grove before attending the Bishop Otter College in Chichester. Venning produced bronze sculptures and also painted portraits and miniatures. Between 1916 and 1936 she exhibited both sculptures and miniatures at the Royal Academy in London.

Further reading
Dictionary of British Artists Working 1900–1950 by Grant M. Waters, 1975, published by Eastbourne Fine Art

References

1885 births
1942 deaths
20th-century British sculptors
20th-century English women artists
Alumni of the University of Chichester
English women sculptors
People educated at Mary Datchelor School
People from Camberwell
Sculptors from London